is a private university in Japan.  Its main campus is in Tempaku-ku, Nagoya, Aichi Prefecture, and it has two other campuses in Nagoya, Aichi Prefecture. It had two faculty members who were Nobel laureates as of 2021.

History 

It is the largest university in the Chūkyō Metropolitan Area.

Notable faculty
 Ryōji Noyori, guest professor of Meijo University, awarded the 2001 Nobel Prize in Chemistry
 Sumio Iijima, tenured professor of Meijo University, scientist, awarded the 2008 Kavli Prize, the 2009 Order of Culture and so on
 Isamu Akasaki, tenured professor of Meijo University, scientist, awarded the 2014 Nobel Prize in Physics
 Hiroshi Amano, former professor of Meijo University, awarded the 2014 Nobel Prize in Physics 
 Akira Yoshino, professor of Meijo University, chemist, awarded the 2014 Charles Stark Draper Prize and the 2019 Nobel Prize in Chemistry
 Fumitada Itakura, former professor of Meijo University, scientist, awarded the 2005 IEEE Jack S. Kilby Signal Processing Medal
 Katsuyoshi Kato, Lawyer

Notable graduates
 Yoshihiro Sato, boxer
 Tatsutoshi Goto, professional wrestler
 Takuya Kirimoto, actor

See also
 Shiogamaguchi Station
 Yagoto Station
 Nishi Kani Station

References

External links
 Official website

Universities and colleges in Nagoya
Educational institutions established in 1926
Private universities and colleges in Japan
Universities and colleges in Gifu Prefecture
1926 establishments in Japan